The  Iowa Barnstormers season was the 12th season for the franchise, and the eighth in the Arena Football League. The team was coached by Mike Hohensee. The Barnstormers played their home games at Wells Fargo Arena. The Barnstormers finished the season 7–11 and failed to qualify for the playoffs.

Offseason

Free Agency

Standings

Schedule
The Barnstormers began the season on the road against the Spokane Shock on March 12. Their first home game of the season was against the Utah Blaze on March 17. They hosted the San Antonio Talons on July 21 in their final regular season game.

Roster

References

Iowa Barnstormers
Iowa Barnstormers
Iowa Barnstormers seasons